John Smilie (1741December 30, 1812) was an Irish-American politician from Newtownards, County Down, Ireland. He served in both houses of the state legislature and represented Pennsylvania in the U.S. House from 1793 until 1795 and from 1799 to 1812.

Biography 
Smilie was born in Ireland and immigrated on May 24, 1762, settling first in Lancaster County. He moved to Fayette in 1780. 
He was a prominent Jeffersonian and was identified with the "'Quid" branch of the party. In 1806–07, during the debates over the abolition of the slave trade, Smilie was among the most outspoken against the evils of the slave trade.  He argued that slaves illegally imported after 1808 should be freed, and that slave smugglers deserved the death penalty.  Neither provision was adopted.

Congress 
He was elected to the Thirteenth Congress in 1812 but died before it opened.

In 1791, Smilie was elected a member of the American Philosophical Society.

Death 
He died in Washington, D.C., aged 71, and is buried in the Congressional Cemetery there.

See also
List of United States Congress members who died in office (1790–1899)

References

Further reading
Everett, Edward. "John Smilie, Forgotten Champion of Early Western Pennsylvania." Western Pennsylvania Historical Magazine 33 (September–December 1950), 77–89.

External links
Biographic sketch at U.S. Congress website
Grave Location in the Congressional Cemetery

1741 births
1812 deaths
American people of Scotch-Irish descent
Burials at the Congressional Cemetery
Kingdom of Ireland emigrants to the Thirteen Colonies
Members of the Pennsylvania House of Representatives
Pennsylvania state senators
People from Fayette County, Pennsylvania
People of the Whiskey Rebellion
Democratic-Republican Party members of the United States House of Representatives from Pennsylvania